Terrorist is the second album by Norwegian black metal artist Nattefrost.

Track listing
All Lyrics & Music By Nattefrost, except where noted.
 "Nekronaut (Cunt Cunt Gimme More)" – 3:28
 "Black Metal Suicide (Claws of Perdition)" – 2:12
 "Hellcommander" – 4:16
 "Terrorist" – 2:56
 "Merket For Helvete" (Marked For Hell) 112– 2:15 (Lyrics: Taipan)
 "Eine Kleine Arschmuzick" – 1:39
 "Satan is Endless, Satan is Timeless" – 1:37
 "Primitive Death" – 3:49
 "Goat Worship" – 5:17
 "Catapultam Urinam Philosophiam" – 0:49
 "Preteen Deathfuck" – 1:34
 "Dinsadansdjeveldyrkaar!!! (Youdamndevilworshiper!!!) – 2:27
 "The Death of Nattefrost (Still Reaching for Hell Part II)" – 16:07

Personnel
Nattefrost: Vocals, Guitars, Bass, B-3 Organ, Whistling, Various Noise
Vrangsinn: Bass, Lead Guitar, Backing Vocals
Nordavind: Guitars, Backing Vocals
Aggressor, Joe Ronny Moe, Dirge Rep, Gunnar Stallseth: Drums
Sanrabb, Taaken, Taipan, Ulvhedin Hoest, Kulde, The Transsexual Uberdwarves: Backing Vocals

Production
Produced, Engineered & Mixed By Nattefrost ("Nattepenis") & Vrangsinn

External links
"Terrorist" at discogs: link

2005 albums
Nattefrost albums
Season of Mist albums